Sceaux is a commune in the Hauts-de-Seine department in the southern suburbs of Paris, France. In 2019, Sceaux had a population of 20,004.

A wealthy city
The original château was transformed into a School of Agriculture during the Revolution and lost much of its luster. It was demolished at the beginning of the 19th century following its sale by the then French government. Sceaux castle was originally built by Jean-Baptiste Colbert, the minister of finance to Louis XIV and purchased by Louis' illegitimate son, the Duke of Maine in 1699. His duchesse held court in a glittering salon at Sceaux in the first decades of the eighteenth century.

The present-day château, rebuilt between 1856 and 1862 in a Louis XIII style, is now the museum of Île-de-France open for visits.

Housing costs are extremely high, higher than in many districts of the Paris area, especially with streets facing the Parc de Sceaux. Sceaux is one of the richest cities of France, according to definition of a city provided by the INSEE.

Transport
Sceaux is served by three stations on Paris RER line B: Sceaux, Robinson, and Parc de Sceaux. The latter station is located at the border between the commune of Sceaux and the commune of Antony, on the Antony side of the border. It is also close to Paris-Orly Airport.

Sceaux is connected to the A86 motorway that circles around Paris. The commune also offers a developed network of buses which are often used by the Scéens (the name given to the residents of Sceaux).

Population

Education

Primary and secondary schools

The commune has the following primary schools:
Public preschools/nurseries (maternelles): des Blagis, du Centre, Clos-Saint-Marcel, du Petit-Chambord
Public elementary schools: des Blagis, du Centre, Clos-Saint-Marcel
One private preschool and elementary school: Écoles maternelle et élémentaire Sainte-Jeanne-d’Arc

Sceaux hosts two cités scolaires, combined junior high schools and public high schools/sixth-form colleges, the lycée Marie Curie and the lycée Lakanal. The lycée Marie Curie was named after the famous scientist who was married in, lived in, and was originally interred in Sceaux with her husband Pierre Curie. The lycée Lakanal was named after a French politician, and an original member of the Institut de France, Joseph Lakanal and has remained one of the most prestigious and hardest schools of Île-de-France. The school also offers a middle school and highly ranked "classes préparatoires" undergraduate training. Famous French scientists and writers have graduated from lycée Lakanal, such as Nobel Prize winners Maurice Allais, Jean Giraudoux, Alain-Fournier and Frédéric Joliot-Curie.

There is also a public vocational senior high, Lycée des métiers Florian.

There is a private junior high school, Externat Sainte-Jeanne-d’Arc.

Colleges and universities
The Faculté Jean Monnet, the college of Law and Management of University of Paris-XI (Orsay), the Institut Universitaire de Technologie of this university and L'Ecole Polytechnique Féminine (EPF) are also located in Sceaux.

Public libraries
The Bibliothèque municipale de Sceaux is the communal library.

Cultural life

Sceaux is home to one highly active national theater, the théâtre des Gémeaux, located in the quartier des Blagis which is part of the "Scène Nationale" network of the major theaters in France. The théâtre des Gémeaux attracts audiences from all over Île-de-France and Paris. Its main event is the Spring dance festival with an international program of the highest quality.

The commune also has a small movie theater, the Trianon, where international movies are released in their respective language and subtitled in French. The theater is also known for showing independent films and hosting special events. In 2006, a debate revolving around ecology was organized and Al Gore's An Inconvenient Truth was shown.

Various music events take place at Sceaux. The classical Music Festival established by Alfred Loewenguth in 1969 (in 2010 entering its 41st season), takes place in the Orangery built by Jules Hardouin-Mansart for the Marquis de Seignelay in 1686, in the Park at Sceaux. The Park also houses an open air opera every summer at the end of June.

The Parc de Sceaux was the location of Madonna's Parisian first visit with her Who's That Girl World Tour 29 August 1987, front 131,000 people, the largest crowd of any concert in French history. 

In the classic French O-Level textbook series for English-speaking pupils, Le Francais d'Aujourd-hui, the Bertillon family move out to Sceaux from inner-city Paris during the course of the book's main narrative.

Wildlife

The Parc de Sceaux is home to a population of red squirrels estimated to number between 100 and 120.

Twin towns
 Royal Leamington Spa (United Kingdom)
 Brühl (Germany)

See also
Communes of the Hauts-de-Seine department
 Ligne de Sceaux
The works of Maxime Real del Sarte

References

External links

 Sceaux official website (in French)

Communes of Hauts-de-Seine